Lin Ruo (July 19, 1924 – October 7, 2012) was a Chinese politician who served as Party Committee Secretary of Guangdong Province.

Biography 
Lin was a native of Chao'an District, Chaozhou City, Guangdong. He joined the Chinese Communist Party (CCP) in May 1945. In July 1945, he enrolled in the Sun Yat-sen University School of Literature. In 1947, he traveled to the Dong River guerilla warfare region to provide political guidance. In March 1950, he was named the head of the CCP Guangdong Pearl River Local Committee Policy Research Office Group, as well as local positions in Zhongshan and Dongguan. In 1952, he was named party committee secretary of Dongguan. Lin was attacked during the Cultural Revolution. In February 1971, he was named to the Zhenjiang local party committee, and in 1973 became the deputy party secretary and deputy Revolutionary Committee director of the Nanfang Daily newspaper. In 1975, Lin became the Guangzhou municipal party committee first secretary, and in 1982 transferred to become the Guangdong provincial party committee first secretary. From 1985 to 1991, Lin served as the Guangdong provincial party committee secretary. From 1990 through December 1996, he served as chairman and party group secretary of the Guangdong provincial people's congress standing committee. He retired in September 2004. Lin died on October 7, 2012 in Guangzhou following an illness.

Lin Ruo was a delegate to each National Congress of the Chinese Communist Party from the 12th through the 17th, a member of the 12th and 13th Central Committees of the Chinese Communist Party, and a delegate to the 7th and 8th National People's Congresses.

References 

1924 births
2012 deaths
Sun Yat-sen University alumni
National Sun Yat-sen University alumni
Chinese Communist Party politicians from Guangdong
People's Republic of China politicians from Guangdong
Political office-holders in Guangdong
Politicians from Chaozhou
Members of the 12th Central Committee of the Chinese Communist Party
Members of the 13th Central Committee of the Chinese Communist Party